Miloš Ćoćić (born 5 June 2003) is a Serbian professional footballer who plays as a winger or attacking midfielder for 1860 Munich.

Club career 
Ćoćić arrived to TSV 1860 Munich in 2016 from TSV Milbertshofen.

He made his 3. Liga debut for 1860 Munich on the 12 December that same year, playing the very last minutes of a 2–0 away win against Borussia Dortmund II.

References

External links

2003 births
Living people
Serbian footballers
Association football forwards
3. Liga players
TSV 1860 Munich players